Daiki Suzuki is a Japanese-born American fashion designer.

Style
Suzuki says of his work, "I try to choose good dynamic designs with patterns that can be modified for today's use. Usually I re-work the fits as lightly as possible, being careful not to re-produce vintage designs—adding some things and taking some off, balancing it out to make it look new."

Woolrich Woolen Mills
In the 1970s Suzuki was one of the first buyers of Woolrich fashion in Japan.  In 2006 he became a designer for Woolrich Woolen Mills in America.

Engineered Garments
Suzuki founded Engineered Garments as a fashion design and production company in 1999.  Engineered Garments produces variations of sportsgear and hunting wear.

References

External links
 Engineered Garments
• Nepenthes NY

Living people
Japanese fashion designers
American fashion designers
Japanese emigrants to the United States
Year of birth missing (living people)